Neotetracus is a genus of gymnure that contains a single extant species, the shrew gymnure (Neotetracus sinensis) of China and Southeast Asia.

Another fossil species is also known from the Miocene of Thailand, Neotetracus butleri.

References

Mammal genera
Mammal genera with one living species
Gymnures